Christen Industries was an American aircraft manufacturer based in Hollister, California and Afton, Wyoming.

History
Founded in 1972, the company was created to manufacture the Christen Eagle, after designer Frank L. Christensen was unable to acquire the design rights to the Pitts Special. Later that year, a three-man team from the company became the first American team to win the world aerobatic championship. In 1983, the company announced that it acquired the design rights of the Laser 200 designed by Leo Loudenslager.

In 1982, the company acquired Aerotek, moved to Afton, Wyoming and continued production of the Pitts Special alongside the Christen Eagle II kits. The company then designed and manufactured the Christen Husky A-1 utility aircraft. In 1990, the company was the subject of a lawsuit claiming that the design of their aircraft was responsible for the death of a pilot. Christen Industries was, in turn, bought by Aviat Aircraft, Inc. in 1991, who continued both product lines.

Aircraft

References

Notes

Bibliography

External links 

Defunct aircraft manufacturers of the United States
Companies based in San Benito County, California